The Palace of Children and Youth Creativity is an educational youth center in Rostov-on-Don, Russia. It works with roughly 1,100 children from ages 5 to 18 and employs 300 educators. It is located in the former Volga-Kama Bank Building, at 55 Bolshaya Sadovaya Street.

History 
On 23 May 1936, the Palace of Pioneers and October was opened in Rostov-on-Don in the former Volga-Kama Bank Building at the corner of Gazetny Lane and Engels Street (now Bolshaya Sadovaya Street), which had been designed by architect Alexei Beketov.

In the autumn of 1936, the first two sections of the Palace, science-technical and artistic, were opened for operation. Its departments opened in series: naturalistic department (1937); military sports department (1938); political-mass department (1939). By 1940 the basic structure of the Palace of Pioneers had been formed, uniting more than 40 circles, studios, laboratories and art groups.

During the Great Patriotic War (1941-1945) work groups and sections of the Palace of the Pioneers were suspended during the occupation of the city by German troops. Many teachers went to the front. In the first post-war years, almost all previously existing sections continued their work.

At this period a musical studio, a club for pre-schoolers and junior classes «Little Star», IFC (KID) (International Friendship Club), the City Pioneer Horn Staff, the Komsomol staff of senior pupils "Restless Hearts" began to function.

From 1970 to the 1980s a history museum, Pioneer Organization, and the Don clubs "Young Medic", "Young Pilot" and "Young Sailor" became popular.

On the left bank of the river Don the city camp of the Pioneer, Komsomol activists and pioneer leaders "Silver Pipe" was opened. At the Memorial complex to the Fallen Warriors the Pioneer and Komsomol Post № 1 was organized. It is an honor for the students to be selected to be on watch at this memorial.

One of the most important events of this period was opening of the YUNO (Young Scientific Society), later - DANUI (Don Academy of Young Researchers). At annual conferences reports of young researchers in different fields of science were read and discussed. The design of the Museum of History of the Russian Fleet "Sea Glory" was completed.

In 1991, the Palace of Pioneers was renamed the Palace of Children and Youth Creativity of Rostov-on-Don. During the years of the financial crisis of the 1990s employees of the Palace stayed with the institution, opened the museums "Stories of the Don Region" and "Young Defenders of the Fatherland"; established the work of new clubs: "Petit" (young journalists) and "UNECA "(Young ecologists) and opened the first summer city school for gifted children" Hope".

Structure 
Ten departments operate in the Palace:

 Military-patriotic department
 Music studio
 Department of Applied Arts
 Department of social creativity
 Art department
 Ecological department
 Center for the development of children's and youth social initiativea
 Psychological service
 Gift center

References 

Tourist attractions in Rostov-on-Don
Buildings and structures in Rostov-on-Don
1936 establishments in Russia
Education in Rostov-on-Don